Ácido Argentino is the second studio album by Argentine thrash metal band Hermética, released in 1991 by Trípoli Discos.

Details
This is the first album featuring drummer Claudio Strunz. Same as the previous release, Intérpretes, Ácido Argentino was recorded at Estudios Aguilar, in Buenos Aires, and issued in December 1991.
Lyrics composer and bassist Ricardo Iorio stated that the song "Memoria de Siglos' is based on an I Ching interpretation by occult writer Hector Morel.

Track listing

Personnel
Band

Claudio O'Connor - lead vocals.
Antonio Romano - guitar.
Ricardo Iorio - bass guitar, vocals on "En las calles de Liniers" and "Del Camionero"
Claudio Strunz - drums.

Others

 Martin Menzel - Recording Technician
 Fernando Risitas - Assistant
 Ezequiel Samperi- Assistant
 Cristian Jeroncic - Assistant
 L. Rizzo - Assistant
 Ramon - Assistant
 Tyson - Assistant
 J. Laluz - Album Artwork
 Eric de Haas - Photography
 Martin Gimeno - Press/Promotion
 Marcelo Tommy Moya - Management
 Sergio Fasanelli, Walter Kolm - Executive producers

References

Hermética's biography at Rock.com.ar

1991 albums
Hermética albums